Bernau may refer to:

Bernau bei Berlin, a town in Brandenburg, Germany
Bernau am Chiemsee, a municipality in the district of Rosenheim in Bavaria, Germany
Bernau im Schwarzwald, a municipality in Baden-Württemberg, Germany
Bernau im Rhein-Neckar-Kreis, a part of Waibstadt in Baden-Württemberg, Germany